Air Commodore Michael Horace Miller  (14 January 1928 – 8 October 2016) was a senior Royal Air Force officer who was active in the post-war years. He served as Commandant Royal Observer Corps from 1975 to 1977, and was Station Commander of RAF Gutersloh from 1971 to 1973.

He died from anaemia on 8 October 2016 at the age of 88.

Honours and awards
 1 January 1969 Wing Commander Michael Horace Miller was awarded the Air Force Cross.
 2 June 1973 Group Captain Michael Horace Miller AFC was appointed a Commander of the Order of the British Empire.

References

|-

|-

1928 births
2016 deaths
Military personnel from Dorset
Commanders of the Order of the British Empire
People of the Royal Observer Corps
Recipients of the Air Force Cross (United Kingdom)
Royal Air Force officers